The 2018–19 Segunda División season, also known as LaLiga 1|2|3 for sponsorship reasons, was the 88th season of the Spanish football second division since its establishment.

Summary
On 18 January 2019, just one day before the start of the second half of the season, the LFP expelled Reus, due to their failure to pay their players. On 1 June 2019, Extremadura UD player José Antonio Reyes was killed in a car crash in his native hometown Utrera ahead of the last matchday 2018–19 season.

Team changes 
This was the first edition without reserve teams since the 2002–03 season.

Stadiums and locations

Personnel and sponsorship

Managerial changes

League table

Standings

Positions by round
The table lists the positions of teams after each week of matches. In order to preserve chronological evolvements, any postponed matches are not included to the round at which they were originally scheduled, but added to the full round they were played immediately afterwards. For example, if a match is scheduled for matchday 13, but then postponed and played between days 16 and 17, it will be added to the standings for day 16.

Results

1 The opponents of Reus awarded a 1–0 w/o win each.

Promotion play-offs

Season statistics

Scoring
First goal of the season:   Álex Fernández for Cádiz against Almería (17 August 2018)
Last goal of the season: Regular season:  Nano for Tenerife against Zaragoza (9 June 2019)Play-offs:  Abdón Prats for Mallorca against Deportivo La Coruña (23 June 2019)

Top goalscorers

Top assists

Zamora Trophy
The Zamora Trophy was awarded by newspaper Marca to the goalkeeper with the least goals-to-games ratio. Keepers had to play at least 28 games of 60 or more minutes to be eligible for the trophy.

Hat-tricks

Note
4 Player scored 4 goals; (H) – Home ; (A) – Away

Discipline

Player
 Most yellow cards: 20
  Manuel Sánchez (Elche)
 Most red cards: 3
  Carlos Bellvís (Alcorcón)
  Roman Zozulya (Albacete)

Team
 Most yellow cards: 141
 Tenerife
 Most red cards: 9
 Deportivo La Coruña
 Fewest yellow cards: 42
 Reus
 Fewest red cards: 0
 Reus

Average attendances 
Attendances include play-off games.

Monthly awards

References

External links
La Liga website

 
2018-19
2
Spain